Yuan Yang (born 12 December 1985 in China) is a retired Chinese-born Hong Kong professional football player who last played as a forward.

Club career
In 2004, Yuan signed for Hong Kong First Division club Citizen and scored 12 goals in his first season in Hong Kong.

In 2009, Yuan signed for First Division club Tai Chung.

In 2010, Yuan returned to Citizen.

In 2013, Yuan signed for Hong Kong First Division League club Sun Pegasus.

In 2014, Yuan signed for Hong Kong Premier League club Yuen Long.

Honours
 Citizen
Hong Kong Senior Shield: 2010–11
Hong Kong FA Cup: 2007–08

References

External links
 Yuan Yang at HKFA

1985 births
Living people
Hong Kong footballers
Footballers from Dalian
Hong Kong First Division League players
Hong Kong Premier League players
Citizen AA players
TSW Pegasus FC players
Yuen Long FC players
Association football forwards